In mathematics, the Schwarzian derivative is an operator similar to the derivative which is invariant under Möbius transformations. Thus, it occurs in the theory of the complex projective line, and in particular, in the theory of modular forms and hypergeometric functions. It plays an important role in the theory of univalent functions, conformal mapping and Teichmüller spaces. It is named after the German mathematician Hermann Schwarz.

Definition
The Schwarzian derivative of a holomorphic function  of one complex variable  is defined by

The same formula also defines the Schwarzian derivative of a  function of one real variable.
The alternative notation

is frequently used.

Properties
The Schwarzian derivative of any Möbius transformation

 

is zero. Conversely, the Möbius transformations are the only functions with this property. Thus, the Schwarzian derivative precisely measures the degree to which  a function fails to be a Möbius transformation.

 

More generally, for any sufficiently differentiable functions  and 

 

Introducing the function of two complex variables

its second mixed partial derivative is given by

and the Schwarzian derivative is given by the formula:

The Schwarzian derivative has a simple inversion formula, exchanging the dependent and the independent variables. One has

which follows from the inverse function theorem, namely that

Differential equation
The Schwarzian derivative has a fundamental relation with a second-order linear ordinary differential equation in the complex plane. Let  and  be two linearly independent holomorphic solutions of

Then the ratio  satisfies

When a linear second-order ordinary differential equation can be brought into the above form, the resulting  is sometimes called the Q-value of the equation.

Note that the Gaussian hypergeometric differential equation can be brought into the above form, and thus pairs of solutions to the hypergeometric equation are related in this way.

Conditions for univalence

Conversely if  is a holomorphic function on  satisfying

then Nehari proved that  is univalent.

In particular a sufficient condition for univalence is

Conformal mapping of circular arc polygons

The Schwarzian derivative and associated second-order ordinary differential equation can be used to determine the Riemann mapping between the upper half-plane or unit circle and any bounded polygon in the complex plane, the edges of which are circular arcs or straight lines.  For polygons with straight edges, this reduces to the Schwarz–Christoffel mapping, which can be derived directly without using the Schwarzian derivative. The accessory parameters that arise as constants of integration are related to the eigenvalues of the second-order differential equation. Already in 1890 Felix Klein had studied the case of quadrilaterals in terms of the Lamé differential equation.

Let  be a circular arc polygon with angles  in clockwise order. Let  be a holomorphic map extending continuously to a map between the boundaries. Let the vertices correspond to points  on the real axis. Then  is real-valued for  real and not one of the points. By the Schwarz reflection principle  extends to a rational function on the complex plane with a double pole at :

The real numbers  are called accessory parameters. They are subject to three linear constraints:

The mapping  can then be written as

There are  linearly independent accessory parameters, which can be difficult to determine in practise.

For a triangle, when , there are no accessory parameters.

For a quadrilateral the accessory parameters depend on one independent variable .

Thus  are eigenfunctions of a Sturm–Liouville equation on the interval . By the Sturm separation theorem, the non-vanishing of  forces  to be the lowest eigenvalue.

Complex structure on Teichmüller space
Universal Teichmüller space is defined to be the space of real analytic quasiconformal mappings of the unit disc , or equivalently the upper half-plane , onto itself, with two mappings considered to be equivalent if on the boundary one is obtained from the other by composition with a Möbius transformation. Identifying  with the lower hemisphere of the Riemann sphere, any quasiconformal self-map  of the lower hemisphere corresponds naturally to a conformal mapping of the upper hemisphere  onto itself. In fact  is determined as the restriction to the upper hemisphere of the solution of the Beltrami differential equation

where μ is the bounded measurable function defined by

on the lower hemisphere, extended to 0 on the upper hemisphere.

Frederick Gehring showed in 1977 that  is the interior of the closed subset of Schwarzian derivatives of univalent functions.

For a compact Riemann surface  of genus greater than 1, its universal covering space is the unit disc  on which its fundamental group  acts by Möbius transformations. The Teichmüller space of  can be identified with the subspace of the universal Teichmüller space invariant under . The holomorphic functions  have the property that

Diffeomorphism group of the circle

Crossed homomorphisms
The transformation property

 

allows the Schwarzian derivative to be interpreted as a continuous 1-cocycle or crossed homomorphism of the diffeomorphism group of the circle with coefficients in the module of densities of degree 2 on the circle.
If  is an element of  then consider the mapping

In fact

The computation of 1-cohomology is a particular case of the more general result

In particular for 1-cocycles χ with

 
with

Note that if any element  in  satisfies  then . But then, since  is a homomorphism,
, so that  satisfies the equivariance condition .

which satisfies the identity

In both cases the 1-cohomology is defined as the space of crossed homomorphisms modulo coboundaries. The natural correspondence between group homomorphisms and Lie algebra homomorphisms leads to the "van Est inclusion map"

In this way the calculation can be reduced to that of Lie algebra cohomology. By continuity this reduces to the computation of crossed homomorphisms  of the Witt algebra into . The normalisations conditions on the group crossed homomorphism imply the following additional conditions for :

so that .

so that

This forces  for suitable coefficients . The crossed homomorphism condition
 gives a recurrence relation for the :

The condition , implies that . From this condition and the recurrence relation, it follows that up to scalar multiples, this has a unique non-zero solution when  equals 0, 1 or 2 and only the zero solution otherwise. The solution for  corresponds to the group 1-cocycle . The solution for  corresponds to the group 1-cocycle .

Central extensions

Coadjoint action
The group  and its central extension also appear naturally in the context of Teichmüller theory and string theory. Taking boundary values, universal Teichmüller can be identified with the quotient of the group of quasisymmetric homeomorphisms  by the subgroup of Möbius transformations . Since

the homogeneous space  is naturally a subspace of universal Teichmüller space. It is also naturally a complex manifold and this and other natural geometric structures are compatible with those on Teichmüller space. The dual of the Lie algebra of  can be identified with the space of Hill's operators on 

and the coadjoint action of  invokes the Schwarzian derivative. The inverse of the diffeomorphism  sends the Hill's operator to

Pseudogroups and connections
The Schwarzian derivative and the other 1-cocycle defined on  can be extended to biholomorphic between open sets in the complex plane. In this case the local description leads to the theory of analytic pseudogroups, formalizing the theory of infinite-dimensional groups and Lie algebras first studied by Élie Cartan in the 1910s. This is related to affine and projective structures on Riemann surfaces as well as the theory of Schwarzian or projective connections, discussed by Gunning, Schiffer and Hawley.

A particular case of transitive pseudogroups are those which are flat, i.e. contain all complex translations .

The group  has a natural homomorphisms onto the  group  of -jets obtained by taking the truncated power series taken up to the term zk. This group acts faithfully on the space of polynomials of degree  (truncating terms of order higher than k). Thus the group Gk is solvable, a fact also clear from the fact that it is in triangular form for the basis of monomials.

A flat pseudogroup  is said to be "defined by differential equations" if there is a finite integer  such that homomorphism of  into  is faithful and the image is a closed subgroup.

The former is the pseudogroup defined by affine subgroup of the complex Möbius group (the  transformations fixing ); the latter is the pseudogroup defined by the whole complex Möbius group.

This classification can easily be reduced to a Lie algebraic problem since the formal Lie algebra  of  consists of formal vector fields  with F a formal power series. It contains the polynomial vectors fields with basis , which is a subalgebra of the Witt algebra. Note that . It contains  and is invariant under . There are corresponding group elements of the form . Unless , this contradicts the form of subgroup ; so .

The Schwarzian derivative is related to the pseudogroup for the complex Möbius group. The identity

is thus the analogue of a 1-cocycle for the pseudogroup of biholomorphisms with coefficients in holomorphic quadratic differentials. In general 1-cocycle can be defined for holomorphic differentials of any order so that

On the other hand, taking the local holomororphic flow defined by holomorphic vector fields—the exponential of the vector fields—the holomorphic pseudogroup of local biholomorphisms is generated by holomorphic vector fields. If the 1-cocycle  satisfies suitable continuity or analyticity conditions, it induces a 1-cocycle of holomorphic vector fields, also compatible with restriction. Accordingly, it defines a 1-cocycle on holomorphic vector fields on :

Restricting to the Lie algebra of polynomial vector fields with basis , these can be determined using the same methods of Lie algebra cohomology (as in the previous section on crossed homomorphisms). There the calculation was for the whole Witt algebra acting on densities of order , whereas here it is just for a subalgebra acting on holomorphic (or polynomial) differentials of order .

where  is a polynomial.

The 1-cocycles define the three pseudogroups by : this gives the scaling group; the affine group; and the whole complex Möbius group. So these 1-cocycles are the special ordinary differential equations defining the pseudogroup. More significantly they can be used to define corresponding affine or projective structures and connections on Riemann surfaces. This defines the structure of a smooth -manifold if  consists of local diffeomorphims and a Riemann surface if —so that —and  consists of biholomorphisms. If  is the affine pseudogroup,  is said to have an affine structure; and if  is the Möbius pseudogroup,  is said to have a projective structure.

Gunning in 1966 describes how this process can be reversed: for genus , the existence of a projective connection, defined using the Schwarzian derivative 2 and proved using standard results on cohomology, can be used to identify the universal covering surface with the upper half plane or unit disk (a similar result holds for genus 1, using affine connections and ).

See also 
 Riccati equation

Notes

References
, Chapter 6, "Teichmüller Spaces"
]

, Chapter 10,  "The Schwarzian".

, Section 12, "Mapping of polygons with circular arcs".
, "On the theory of generalized Lamé functions".

 

 

Projective geometry
Modular forms
Ordinary differential equations
Complex analysis
Conformal mappings